Agnoderus gnomoides is a species of beetle in the family Cerambycidae, and the only species in the genus Agnoderus. It was described by Thomson in 1864.

References

Lamiini
Beetles described in 1864